Touching heads is a uniquely human emotional expression that does not occur in nonhuman primates. All races, age groups and sexes of humankind interpret this behavior as an expression of positive emotions, such as love—including brotherly love, friendship etc.

It is absent in other apes, though they tend to use the same bodily expressions of emotions like humans. A 2012 study claimed that this behavior likely evolved in humans to share head lice among friends and relatives. Head lice infestations might serve as a protection against body lice by inducing cross-resistance. This can be adaptive because only the latter type of lice transmit potentially lethal human pathogens.

References

Gestures
Human communication
Human head and neck